Acronicta lepusculina, the cottonwood dagger moth, is a moth of the family Noctuidae. The species was first described by Achille Guenée in 1852. It is found in most of eastern North America, west through southern Canada to Vancouver Island and southward.

The wingspan is 40–50 mm. Adults are on wing from May to July depending on the location.

The larvae feed on the leaves of Salix, Populus and Betula species.

References

Further reading

External links

Acronicta
Moths of North America
Moths described in 1852